Glanworth Abbey, also known as the Priory of the Holy Cross and as the Rock Abbey is a ruined Dominican abbey in Glanworth, County Cork, Ireland.

History 
Despite early estimations of the foundation as being in 1227, the abbey is not included in the Dominican catalogue of 1300. The foundation is more likely to have been in 1475. The abbey was suppressed circa. February 1541.

Architecture 
The abbey would once have featured a cemetery, a church including a belfry, a cloister, and a dormitory. The abbey sat on an acreage of 10 acres, and itself enclosed one acre.

References

Notes

Sources 

Former religious buildings and structures in the Republic of Ireland
Ruins in the Republic of Ireland
Religious buildings and structures in County Cork
Dominican monasteries in the Republic of Ireland